is a railway station on the Kintetsu Kashihara Line, located in Kashihara, Nara, Japan. It is a typical small station, but has a unique status as a non-independent station. For a historical reason, the station is a part of Yamato-Yagi Station, a large intersection station located about 300 meters north of the station.

History 
The station is the original site of Yamato-Yagi Station which opened here in 1923 and moved to the present location in 1929 when the railway company did not remove the original platforms of the station and continued the service with the old facilities as well as the new Yamato-Yagi Station. Yagi-nishiguchi Station is therefore treated as the same station as Yamato-Yagi Station on some occasions, such as the calculation of distance-based fares. However, travel between Yagi-nishiguchi Station and Yamato-Yagi Station costs 150 yen, even though it is a mere move within the station, and walking the distance will take no longer than 5 minutes.

Lines 
 Kintetsu Railway
 Kashihara Line

Platforms and tracks

References

External links
 

Railway stations in Nara Prefecture